The Komdok mine(검덕광업연합기업소) is one of the largest lead and zinc mines in North Korea and in the world. The mine is located in Kumgol-dong, Tanchon. The mine has estimated reserves of 266 million tonnes of ore 0.88% lead and 4.21% zinc.

Following the damages caused by Typhoon Maysak, Kim Jong-un directed for the Komdok region to be transformed into a 'model mountainous city and a mining city' as a part of the 80 day campaign for the 8th Congress of the Workers' Party of Korea.

A trolleybus line formerly existed to serve this region running from Kumgol-1 dong to Kumgol-3 dong. It was opened in 1986 and served by three trolleybuses until they were removed by 2011. The southern loop at Kumgol station was removed around or before 2015.

References 

Lead mines in North Korea
Zinc mines in North Korea